Örgryte new church is a church in the gothic style on Svalberget. The church is a part of the Örgryte congregation in Gothenburg. Because of the nature of the plot, the church is oriented northeast–southwest. It has a cross layout with open rafters and vaulted, pentagonal chancels. The church tower is almost 60 meters tall.

History 
From 1870, the churchgoers of Örgryte contemplated a major project as their existing 400-seat church could not contain the growing congregation. In 1885, under the leadership of the Reverend Magnus Ekberg, construction of a new church was proposed. A collection was taken and the church agreed to take a loan of SEK 50,000 to meet the estimated cost. Among the generous contributors were merchant David Lundstrom of Underås farm, James Dickson, David Carnegie and Oscar Ekman. The new church was to be more than twice the size of the existing church, seating over 1,000 people. The new building followed the trend of its contemporary churches and was made from brick. The building required firm ground, so it was built on top of the Svalberget.  Some of the major purchases were made as individual donations. The local brewer, JW Lyckholm of Skår, paid for two bells. Captain Pontus Virgin of  Kålltorp paid for the altar while the stained glass windows were donated by the wholesaler Peter Hammarberg.

The architect was Adrian C. Peterson, and the builder was F O Peterson. Work began in the summer of 1888, and the church was consecrated on July 6, 1890 by bishop Edvard Rodhe. The final cost was 226,000 SEK. Donations covered slightly more than 120,000 and the remaining sum was procured through a loan of SEK 50,000 and from the church fund.

The church is built in red Börringe Brick from Skåne, and did not receive electricity until 1908. The facades have rich tegelornering, stone moldings and forgings.

A thorough restoration took place in 1937 under A. Forsséns line, and the pulpit was moved. In 1952, four painted circular windows of the chancel were transferred to the stands, while other painted korfönster (stained glass) from 1889, magazines were.

Church organs
The church has two organs:
 Willis organ, originally built  1871 for St. Stephen's Church in Hampstead, London by Henry Willis, who was the leading organ-builder in England from 1850. When the church in Hampstead was closed in 1971, the organ was disassembled and sold to the Netherlands. In 1992, the Academy of Music in Gothenburg learned of the instrument, after which it was purchased by Tostareds Organ Factory and in 1998 by the Örgryte Assembly Organ Foundation. The organ is the largest Victorian organ of British manufacture in Sweden.
 The North German Baroque organ, built as part of extensive research at the University of Gothenburg and Chalmers. It was constructed at the GOArt (Göteborg Organ Art Center) workshop under the leadership of Mats Arvidsson, Henk van Eeken and Munetaka Yokota. The instrument has four manuals and pedal, with 54 stops distributed. The goal had been to recreate a North German baroque organ, the Arp Schnitger (1648–1719).

The church bells 

The church tower has two bells, each with the inscription:
 The Oscar II government when D r E. H.
 Rodhe was a bishop in the Diocese of Gothenburg and
 Dean J. M. Ekberg vicar of Örgryte
 Became the bell cast at Eriksbergs
 Mech. Werkstad in 1899 the factory owner
 J. W. Lyckholms expense.

The larger bell has the inscription: 
 Come, for all things are now ready. Luc. 14:17
 Tacker Lord into his gates
 Lofver him in his yard
 Come here from all locations
 Prices on about us, care
 For he is the good and gentle
 Keeps faith forever.

... And the smaller 
 It's a kostelig things to thank the Lord
 And lofsjunga your name to most high
 The morning proclaim your mercy
 And the evening your truth. Psalm 92:2,3
 Glory to the Father and His Son
 The holy spirit in the throne
 Holy trinity
 Be praised and praise forever.

Altarpiece 

In 1950, the church painter Thor Fagerkvist (1884–1960) was commissioned to paint an altarpiece for the church. It would replace Carl Johan Dyfverman's crucifixion group from 1890. It was a triptych consisting of five oil paintings on canvas, three of which are usually visible with pictures related to Christmas, Easter and Pentecost, while the cabinet is closed during Lent, and then shows the other two paintings, photographed wagon and no Gethsemane. The frame was designed by architect Axel Forssén.

 The old altar
The great altar of cut oak wood was placed on the altar in the church in 1890, and was the work of Dyfverman. The subject is the crucified Jesus with Mary, the other Mary and the disciple John, beneath the cross. The sculpture was painted in 1923, and in 1969 was restored by artwork conservator Torsten Öhlén. Crucifixion group was moved in 1951 to its current location in the transept.

Altar 

On the altar stood a 1952 crucifix of ivory and ebony by Gothenburg sculptor Henry Johansson, as well as the altar a gift of parishioners. Since the altar faced Assembly crucifix moved to the sacristy.

Font 

The baptismal font was designed by architect Axel Forssén. Dean Ekberg's successor, Reverend Magnus Nilman (1855–1927), donated it along with dopfatet of copper to the new church in 1927    When was returned while the maroon kalkstensfunten to the old church.

References

Further reading
Örgryte nya kyrka: Göteborg, red. Bengt Åberg, Lennart Widing, Henrik Tobin, Örgryte församling, Göteborg 2000
Örgryte nya kyrka 75 år, Örgryte församling, Göteborg 1965
Örgryte nya kyrka at Svenskakyrkan.se

Churches in Gothenburg
19th-century Church of Sweden church buildings
Churches completed in 1890
Churches in the Diocese of Gothenburg
Gothic Revival church buildings in Sweden